Breakers FC is an American soccer club based in Santa Cruz, California, United States founded in 1992.  The club is a founding member of the Elite Youth Development Platform with partner Major League Soccer in 2020. The club signed Niša Saveljić to be their director of coaching in June 2020. In 2018 the club began fielding a team in the Premier Development League, now known as USL League Two, playing its home games at Carl Conelly Stadium on the campus of Cabrillo College in Aptos, California. The team's colors are dark blue, sky blue, gold and white.

In 2007 and 2008, Breakers FC fielded teams in the National Premier Soccer League (NPSL), a national amateur league at the fourth tier of the American Soccer Pyramid.

Leadership 
President:  USA - Lepa Galeb-Roskopp
Vice-President: USA - Rob Roskopp
Sports Director:  Montenegro - Niša Saveljić
Director of Methodology:  France - Stéphane D'Urbano
Coaches:
 Serbia - Zoran Djuric
 France - Matthieu Delcroix
 USA - Michael Runeare
 USA - Tim Martin
 Spain - Sergi Tortell Turon
 USA - Daniel Ortega
 Scotland - Mark Christies
 Peru - Johnny Olaya

References

External links
 

Soccer clubs in California
Sports in Santa Cruz County, California
MLS Next